Ponfeigh railway station served the hamlet of Douglas Water, in the historical county of Lanarkshire, Scotland, from 1864 to 1964 on the	Douglas Branch.

History 
The station was opened on 1 April 1864 on the Caledonian Railway. It was locally known as Rigside. The goods yard was in between the junction. It has a goods shed and a loading bank. The signal box was to the north of the platform. The station closed on 5 October 1964.

References 

Disused railway stations in South Lanarkshire
Former Caledonian Railway stations
Beeching closures in Scotland
Railway stations in Great Britain opened in 1864
Railway stations in Great Britain closed in 1964
1864 establishments in Scotland
1964 disestablishments in Scotland